In algebraic geometry, the main theorem of elimination theory states that every projective scheme is proper. A version of this theorem predates the existence of scheme theory. It can be stated, proved, and applied in the following more classical setting.

The main theorem of elimination theory is a corollary and a generalization of Macaulay's theory of multivariate resultant. The resultant of  homogeneous polynomials in  variables is the value of a polynomial function of the coefficients, which takes the value zero if and only if the polynomials have a common non-trivial zero over some field containing the coefficients.

This belongs to elimination theory, as computing the resultant amounts to eliminate variables between polynomial equations. In fact, given a system of polynomial equations, which is homogeneous in some variables, the resultant eliminates these homogeneous variables by providing an equation in the other variables, which has, as solutions, the values of these other variables in the solutions of the original system.

A simple motivating example

Let 

be the projection

If one extends  to a projective line  the equation of the projective completion of the hyperbola becomes

and contains 

This is commonly expressed by saying the origin of the affine plane is the projection of the point of the hyperbola that is at infinity, in the direction of the -axis.

The main theorem of elimination theory is a wide generalization of this property.

Classical formulation

Any ring homomorphism  from  into a field , defines a ring homomorphism  (also denoted ), by applying  to the coefficients of the polynomials.

Hints for a proof and related results

Using above notation, one has first to characterize the condition that  do not have any non-trivial common zero. This is the case if the maximal homogeneous ideal  is the only homogeneous prime ideal containing  Hilbert's Nullstellensatz asserts that this is the case if and only if  contains a power of each  or, equivalently, that  for some positive integer .

For this study, Macaulay introduced a matrix that is now called Macaulay matrix in degree .

If , the rank of the Macaulay matrix is lower than the number of its rows for every , and, therefore,  have always a non-trivial common zero.

is called Macaulay's degree or Macaulay's bound because Macaulay's has proved that  have a non-trivial common zero if and only if the rank of the Macaulay matrix in degree  is lower than the number to its rows.

Therefore, the ideal  whose existence is asserted by the main theorem of elimination theory, is the zero ideal if , and, otherwise, is generated by the maximal minors of the Macaulay matrix in degree .

Geometrical interpretation

In the preceding formulation, the polynomial ring  defines a morphism of schemes (which are algebraic varieties if  is finitely generated over a field)

Thus the morphism is closed.

See also
Elimination of quantifiers
Macaulay's resultant
Gröbner basis

References

Algebraic geometry